The Harmonic Convergence is the name given to the world's first synchronized global peace meditation, which occurred on August 16–17, 1987. This event also closely coincided with an exceptional alignment of planets in the Solar System.

Although the event had been predicted by author Tony Shearer in his book Lord of the Dawn (1971), the principal organizers of the Harmonic Convergence event were spouses José Argüelles and Lloydine Burris Argüelles via the Planet Art Network (PAN), a peace movement they founded in 1983.

According to Shearer's interpretation of Aztec cosmology, the selected date marked the end of twenty-two cycles of 52 years each, or 1,144 years in all. The twenty-two cycles were divided into thirteen "heaven" cycles, which began in AD 843 and ended in 1519, when the nine "hell" cycles began, ending 468 years later in 1987. The very beginning of the nine "hell" cycles was precisely the day that Hernán Cortés landed in Mexico, April 22, 1519 (coinciding with "1 Reed" on the Aztec/Mayan calendar, the day sacred to Mesoamerican cultural hero Quetzalcoatl). The 9 hell cycles of 52 years each ended precisely on August 16–17, 1987.  Shearer introduced the dates and the prophecy to Arguelles in 1970, and he eventually co-opted them and created the name Harmonic Convergence as the public title of the event.

The timing of the Harmonic Convergence was allegedly significant in the Maya calendar, with some consideration also given to European and Asian astrological traditions. The chosen dates have the distinction of allegedly marking a planetary alignment with the Sun, Moon and six out of eight planets being "part of the grand trine."  Though Arguelles eventually connected the timing of the Harmonic Convergence with his understanding of the significance of Maya calendrics, the dates themselves were derived not from Maya cosmology but from Tony Shearer's reconstructed Aztec prophecies. The next predicted Harmonic convergence (aligning of planets) was to occur on March 3, 2019.

Astrological alignment 

According to the astrologer Neil Michelsen's "The American Ephemeris," on 24 August 1987 there was an exceptional alignment of planets in the Solar System. Eight planets were aligned in an unusual configuration called a grand trine.

The Sun, Moon and six out of eight planets formed part of the grand trine, that is, they were aligned at the apexes of an equilateral triangle when viewed from the Earth.

The Sun, Moon, Mars and Venus were in exact alignment, astrologically called a conjunction at the first degree of Virgo in Tropical Astrology. Mercury was in the  fourth degree of Virgo which most astrologers count as part of the same conjunction being within the "orb" of influence. Jupiter was in Aries, and Saturn and Uranus in Sagittarius completing the grand trine.  However some believe that this is an Earth grand trine with Sun/Moon/Mars/Venus/Mercury in the initial degrees of Virgo, Neptune at 5 degrees of Capricorn, and Jupiter in the last degree of Aries (anaretic degree), on the cusp of Taurus. Uranus, and especially Saturn are on the edge of this trine.

Controversy is associated to the claim that this occurrence was a unique event.  Grand trines, where planets are at 120 degree positions forming an equilateral triangle are not uncommon or particularly noteworthy.  Traditional astrology does not consider trines to be action points, so the notion of a special shift in world history would not be in the offing under a grand trine.  Hence, many traditional astrologers do not regard this occurrence to be of significant importance.  There is no evidence that astronomers have ever considered it significant.

Astrological interpretations 

The convergence is purported to have "corresponded with a great shift in the earth’s energy from warlike to peaceful." Believers of this esoteric prophecy maintain that the Harmonic Convergence ushered in a five-year period of Earth's "cleansing", where many of the planet's "false structures of separation" would collapse.

According to Argüelles, the event came at the end of these "hell" cycles and the beginning of a new age of universal peace. Adherents believed that signs indicated a "major energy shift" was about to occur, a turning point in Earth's collective karma and dharma, and that this energy was powerful enough to change the global perspective of man from one of conflict to one of co-operation. Actress and author Shirley MacLaine called it a "window of light,"  allowing access to higher realms of awareness.

According to Argüelles, the Harmonic Convergence also began the final 25-year countdown to the end of the Mayan Long Count in 2012, which would be the so-called end of history and the beginning of a new 5,125-year cycle. Evils of the modern world (war, materialism, violence, abuses, injustice, oppression, etc.) would have ended with the birth of the 6th Sun and the 5th Earth on December 21, 2012.

Power centers 

An important part of the Harmonic Convergence observances was the idea of congregating at "power centers." Power centers were places, such as Mount Shasta, California,  Mount Fuji, and Mount Yamnuska where the spiritual energy was held to be particularly strong.  The belief was that if 144,000 people assembled at these power centers and meditated for peace, that the arrival of the new era would be facilitated.

See also
 Big Generator - Yes album released in 1987 including the song "Holy Lamb (Song for Harmonic Convergence)".
 2012 phenomenon
Harmonic Convergence (The Legend of Korra)
Planetary alignment
WP:FRINGE

References

 Adapted in part from the Wikinfo article Harmonic Convergence, licensed under the GNU Free Documentation License.

External links
Thirty Years Ago, People Tried to Save the World By Meditating (Smithsonian, August 17, 2017) 
Almanac: The Harmonic Convergence (CBS Sunday Morning, August 16, 2015)
Simulations of planetary positions on August 16, 1987 and December 21, 2012

New Age
Astrology
1987 in the United States
2012 phenomenon